Steve Sarowitz (born 1965/1966) is an American billionaire businessman, and the founder of Paylocity.

Early life
Sarowitz earned a bachelor's degree from the University of Illinois at Urbana–Champaign.

Career
Sarowitz owned 44% of Paylocity at its IPO in March 2014, and 28% in April 2019.

Personal life
Sarowitz is married to Jessica; the couple lives in Highland Park, Illinois. He was raised Jewish, but later embraced the Baháʼí Faith.

References

Living people
1960s births
American billionaires
American company founders
University of Illinois Urbana-Champaign alumni
Converts to the Bahá'í Faith from Judaism
American Bahá'ís
20th-century American Jews